Autonomy is the ninth full-length studio album by Indonesian experimental metal band Kekal, first released on 19 December 2012 as CD version by German record label Whirlwind Records and then digitally by Indonesian record label Yes No Wave Music on June 29, 2013. This is a second Kekal album being recorded and released without official band members. The digital version of Autonomy can be downloaded for free from Archive.org.

There are two official music videos published for this album: "Futuride" and "Rare Earth Elements", released by the band on YouTube prior to the album's release date.

Track listing

Personnel
Jeff Arwadi - Vocals, lead guitar
Levi Sianturi - Bass, vocals
Leo Setiawan - Guitar

Additional credits:
Jeff Arwadi – production, engineering and mixing
Leo Setiawan – additional engineering
Levi Sianturi – photography

References

2012 albums
Kekal albums
Electronic rock albums by Indonesian artists